Steven Frankos is an American fantasy author.

Biography
Frankos is the brother of mystery, fantasy and science fiction author Laura Frankos and the brother-in-law of science fiction author Harry Turtledove.

Literary career
Frankos has written six novels in two different series, all published by Ace Books, as well as short stories.

Bibliography

The Wheel Trilogy
The Jewel of Equilibrant (1993)
The Heart of Sparrill (1993)
The Darklight Grimoire (1994)

Beyond Lich Gate
Beyond Lich Gate (1994)
Cathedral of Thorns (1995)
A Legend Reborn (1997)

Short fiction
"Clover and Clover Again" (1982)
"Toadally Ridiculous" (1983)

References
Harry Turtledove - Associated Authors
Fantastic Fiction entry on Steven Frankos

20th-century American novelists
American fantasy writers
American male novelists
Harry Turtledove
Year of birth missing (living people)
Living people
20th-century American male writers